Hazm Al Markhiya is a neighborhood of Doha, Qatar.

Etymology
In Arabic, "hazm" refers to a natural hill. The other constituent is a reference to the neighboring district of Al Markhiya, which received its name from a tree that grows abundantly in the region known locally as "markh" (Leptadenia pyrotechnica).

Landmarks
Bin Muftah Medical Center on Al Markhiya Street.
Feto Maternal Center on Rawdat Al Tair Street.
West Bay Health Centre on Al Asdaf Street.
Water Networks Affairs Laboratory on Saihan Street.
Green Qatar Centre & Qatar Green Centre Park on Jery Al Hesan Street.
Al Markhiya Complex on Saihan Street.
Embassy Of The Republic Of Venezuela in Doha on Samura Bin Jundub Street.
Embassy of The Central African Republic in Doha on Rawdat Nazwa Street.

Transport
Major roads that run through the district are University Street, Al Khafji Street and Al Markhiya Street.

Demographics
As of the 2010 census, the district comprised 900 housing units and 71 establishments. There were 8,586 people living in the district, of which 48% were male and 52% were female. Out of the 8,586 inhabitants, 67% were 20 years of age or older and 33% were under the age of 20. The literacy rate stood at 95.8%.

Employed persons made up 52% of the total population. Females accounted for 49% of the working population, while males accounted for 51% of the working population.

Education

The following schools are located in Hazm Al Markhiya:

References

Communities in Doha